Bavia is a genus of jumping spiders.

Description
Species of this genus are slender with long legs.

Habits
Bavia is often found on the leaves of shrubs or lower tree branches.

Distribution
Bavia is distributed throughout the Australasian region, with one isolated species found in Madagascar.

Species
, the World Spider Catalog accepted the following species:

 Bavia aericeps Simon, 1877 – Malaysia to Australia, Pacific Islands
 Bavia albolineata Peckham & Peckham, 1885 – Madagascar
 Bavia capistrata (C. L. Koch, 1846) – Malaysia
 Bavia decorata (Thorell, 1890) – Sumatra
 Bavia fedor Berry, Beatty & Prószyński, 1997 – Caroline Islands
 Bavia gabrieli Barrion, 2000 – Philippines
 Bavia hians (Thorell, 1890) – Sumatra
 Bavia intermedia (Karsch, 1880) – Philippines
 Bavia maurerae (Freudenschuss & Seiter, 2016)) – Philippines
 Bavia nessagyna Maddison, 2020 – Malaysia (Borneo)
 Bavia planiceps (Karsch, 1880) – Philippines
 Bavia sexpunctata (Doleschall, 1859) – Indonesia (Sumatra), Malaysia, Japan (Ryūkyū Islands) to Australia
 Bavia sinoamerica Lei & Peng, 2011 – China
 Bavia valida (Keyserling, 1882) – Queensland, Gilbert Islands

Bavia ludicra (Keyserling, 1882) was transferred to genus Sandalodes and synonymized with Sandalodes superbus in 2000.

The name "Bavia kairali" has been used for a species found in India, but the name was not recognized by the World Spider Catalog .

Footnotes

References
  (2000): An Introduction to the Spiders of South East Asia. Malaysian Nature Society, Kuala Lumpur.
  (2007): The world spider catalog, version 8.0. American Museum of Natural History.

Further reading
  (1929): Spolia Mentawiensa: Araneae. The Bulletin of the Raffles Museum 2:125-133 PDF  (description of B. smedleyi and how it is distinct from several similar species)

External links

 Salticidae.org: Diagnostic drawings and photographs

Salticidae genera
Spiders of Asia
Spiders of Australia
Salticidae